Edward Gerald Fleming French (11 December 1883 – 17 September 1970) was an English cricketer.  French was a left-handed batsman, although his bowling style is unknown.  He was born in Woburn Sands, Buckinghamshire.

He was the son of John French, 1st Earl of Ypres.

Educated at Sandroyd School then Wellington College where he represented the college cricket team, French later made his first-class debut for the Marylebone Cricket Club against Scotland in 1922. In 1924, he made his Minor Counties Championship debut for Devon against the Surrey Second XI.  From 1924 to 1927, he represented the county in 20 Championship matches, the last of which came against the Kent Second XI. Nine years later, he made his second and final first-class appearance for the Marylebone Cricket Club against Ireland at Observatory Lane, Dublin. In his two first-class matches, he scored 10 runs at a batting average of 5.00, with a high score of 5. With the ball he bowled 19 wicket-less overs.

He became a Lt Col Hon. Deputy Governor of Dartmoor Prison and Governor of Newcastle Prison. He married Leila King (d. 1959), daughter of Robert King, of Natal, South Africa. The French sisters, Essex Leila Hilary French and Violet Valerie French were his daughters.

He died in Hove, Sussex on 17 September 1970.

References

External links
Edward French at Cricinfo
Edward French at CricketArchive

1883 births
1970 deaths
People from the Borough of Milton Keynes
People from Buckinghamshire
People educated at Sandroyd School
People educated at Wellington College, Berkshire
English cricketers
Marylebone Cricket Club cricketers
Devon cricketers
Younger sons of earls